Louise Maheux-Forcier (June 9, 1929 – February 5, 2015) was a Quebec author.

She was born in Montreal and was educated at the École supérieure Sainte-Croix and then went on to study music at the Conservatoire de musique et d'art dramatique du Québec. From 1952 to 1954, she studied piano with Yves Nat in Paris. Beginning in 1959, however, she decided to concentrate on writing. Her first novel Amadou, published in 1963, explored the then-taboo subject of lesbianism. The novel was awarded the Prix du Cercle du livre de France.

Other novels followed:
 L'Île joyeuse (1965) translated as Isle of Joy (1987)
 Une Forêt pour Zoé (1969), received the Governor General's Award for French-language fiction
 Paroles et musique (1973)
 Appassionata (1978)

She produced a collection of short stories, En toutes lettres (1980), She wrote a number of dramas that were broadcast on the radio and on television by Radio Canada. Her teleplay Ariosa was rejected by Radio-Canada in 1973 because of its lesbian themes, but was eventually produced and aired by the network in 1982.

In 1974, she was named writer in residence at the University of Ottawa. She was admitted to the Académie des lettres du Québec in 1982. In 1985, she was named to the Royal Society of Canada. In 1986, she was admitted to the Order of Canada.

Translation
 in German, transl. Yvonne Petter-Zimmer: Verschwiegenheit, in: Frauen in Kanada. Erzählungen und Gedichte. dtv, Munich 1993 (La discretion, in: En toutes lettres. Editions Pierre Tiseyre, 1980)

References

1929 births
2015 deaths
Canadian women novelists
Canadian women dramatists and playwrights
Members of the Order of Canada
Fellows of the Royal Society of Canada
20th-century Canadian novelists
20th-century Canadian dramatists and playwrights
Journalists from Montreal
Writers from Montreal
Canadian lesbian writers
Canadian LGBT novelists
Canadian LGBT dramatists and playwrights
Canadian radio writers
Women radio writers
Canadian television writers
Governor General's Award-winning fiction writers
20th-century Canadian women writers
Canadian novelists in French
Canadian dramatists and playwrights in French
Place of death missing
Canadian women non-fiction writers
Canadian women television writers
Lesbian screenwriters
Lesbian dramatists and playwrights
Lesbian novelists
20th-century Canadian LGBT people